Ovington House is a late 18th century house in Ovington, Hampshire.

History
The house was built for James Standerwick. It was inherited by his daughter Elizabeth Standerwick, who married, Sir Thomas Richard Swinnerton Dyer, 7th Baronet (c. 1770 – 1838). When he died, she remarried, to Frederick, Baron von Zandt of Würzburg. There were no heirs.

In 1910, the property was acquired by Harvey Hoare of Hoare's Bank.

In 1975, the estate was broken up and sold at auction.

The North Lodge is listed Grade II.

Legacy
London's Ovington Square is named after the estate.

References

Houses in Hampshire